Bomb Queen is an American fictional comic book character, created by Jimmie Robinson. She first appeared in Image Comics' Bomb Queen Vol. 1, #1, and has subsequently appeared in eight limited series, four single-issue specials, and a crossover in The Savage Dragon #134.

The Queen is a villainess who has eliminated and subsequently banned all superheroes from the fictional city of New Port City. She rules the city as a dictator; the limitations she has placed over the city's criminals have made her a popular leader.

Fictional character biography
Bomb Queen was originally part of a quartet of supervillains called The Four Queens, who reigned over New Port City. When all the super-heroes in town were finally defeated or slain, the Queens turned on Bomb Queen. Bomb Queen emerged as the victor, and took control over the local government, without any superpowers of any kind, armed only with bombs and athletic ability.

Bomb Queen founded New Port City's "No Heroes" law, (outlawing superheroes) which made the town a magnet for criminals across America. This pleased politicians in Washington, D.C., due to the lowered crime rates in other states. However, the government was not happy with the self-elected leadership of Bomb Queen and formed a corrupt organization called the Shadow Government to make numerous attempts to eliminate Bomb Queen. Various smear campaigns having failed to dent her immense public popularity, the government turned to other options. In the third volume, Bomb Queen is revealed to be a clone created by the Shadow Government to serve as the prison warden of New Port City, in order to contain its innate evil (her pet cat Ashe), acquiring superpowers for herself after merging with her younger clone Bomb Teen.

Bomb Queen's rule over the city (and her cavalier attitude to crime) caused the city to flourish. The city coffers were overflowing with laundered money, which caused New Port City to rival Las Vegas. This also resulted in private local TV stations, Intranet, and regional cable stations being allowed to air unrated content – often of Bomb Queen herself, in pornographic movies filmed from her fortified townhouse.

The restriction of the city limits kept Bomb Queen confined in her city of crime, but also present extreme danger if she were to ever leave - where the law is ready and waiting. This was illustrated in the one-shot comic, Bomb Queen vs. Blacklight (Aug. 2006). Bomb Queen, in disguise, traveled to Las Vegas in search of a weapon prototype at a gun convention and encountered the superheroine Blacklight.

Ashe
Bomb Queen is never seen without her black cat, Ashe. The animal has mysterious origins and is connected to the Maya of Central America. The cat's powers have saved the day in numerous situations, such as the finale of the Bomb Queen vs. Blacklight oneshot. Later on, Ashe is murdered, but in reality, Ashe is the physical manifestation of a demon whose realm nexus is New Port City, and can manipulate the rage of its citizens, notably Bomb Queen.

Publication history

Under Image Comics' ShadowLine banner, Bomb Queen has been printed as eight mini-series and four one-shots. These are denoted by Roman numerals and subtitles instead of the more traditional sequential order.

Bomb Queen has also appeared in one issue of The Savage Dragon, part 1 of the World Tour arc, which was issue 134.

Miniseries

Oneshots

The oneshot specials are collected in Bomb Queen: Gang Bang (Trade Paper Back) and Bomb Queen Deluxe Edition Volume 4 (Hardcover Edition).

References

External links
Bomb Queen at IGN

Comics characters introduced in 2006
Fictional bisexual females
Fictional dictators
Fictional mass murderers
Image Comics limited series
Image Comics female supervillains
LGBT supervillains
Shadowline titles